Teenage Mutant Ninja Turtles Adventures! is a role-playing game adventure supplement to the Teenage Mutant Ninja Turtles & Other Strangeness game.

Publication history
Teenage Mutant Ninja Turtles Adventures! was written by Erick Wujcik with art by Kevin Eastman and Peter Laird, and was published by Palladium Books in 1986 as a 48-page book.

Contents
Teenage Mutant Ninja Turtles Adventures! consists of five scenarios which pit the player characters against the White Ronin, Doctor Feral, the Terror Bears, Mr. Bionic, and others. The book includes rules for superpowered animals and a 10-page comics story. The book is also suitable for use with Heroes Unlimited.

Description
Teenage Mutant Ninja Turtles Adventures was published by Palladium Books in 1986 and uses the Palladium Megaversal system.  Cat. No. 504, I.S.B.N. 0-916211-16-9. It contains several discreet adventure scenarios, as well as optional rules for Heroes Unlimited style superpowered animals and a comic strip.

Reception
Robert Neville reviewed Teenage Mutant Ninja Turtles Adventures! for White Dwarf #83, and stated that "it's all pretty silly stuff, but it's conveyed in exactly the po-faced style as the comic, and is thoroughly entertaining. TMNT fans will undoubtedly snap this up as avidly as they did the original game, and will find plenty of fun and enjoyment."

Reviews
Different Worlds #46
GamesMaster International Issue 1 - Aug 1990

References

Role-playing game adventures
Role-playing game supplements introduced in 1986
Adventures